Odontocolon is a genus of ichneumon wasps in the family Ichneumonidae. There are at least 40 described species in Odontocolon.

Species
These 42 species belong to the genus Odontocolon:

 Odontocolon abdominale (Cresson, 1865) c g
 Odontocolon aethiops (Cresson, 1865) c g
 Odontocolon alaskense (Rohwer, 1913) c g
 Odontocolon albotibiale (Bradley, 1918) c g b
 Odontocolon appendiculatum (Gravenhorst, 1829) c g
 Odontocolon apterus Kasparyan, 1997 c g
 Odontocolon atripes (Rohwer, 1913) c g
 Odontocolon atrum Chandra, 1978 c g
 Odontocolon bicolor (Cresson, 1870) c g
 Odontocolon brevicaudum (Cushman, 1930) c g
 Odontocolon canadense (Provancher, 1877) c g
 Odontocolon cilipes Townes, 1960 c g
 Odontocolon curtum Townes, 1960 c g
 Odontocolon dentifemorale Wang & Gupta, 1995 c g
 Odontocolon dentipes (Gmelin, 1790) c g
 Odontocolon depressum Townes, 1960 c g
 Odontocolon dichroum (Rohwer, 1913) c g
 Odontocolon dreisbachi Townes, 1960 c g
 Odontocolon formicoides Townes, 1960 c g
 Odontocolon geniculatum (Kriechbaumer, 1889) c g
 Odontocolon hungaricum (Clement, 1938) c g
 Odontocolon indicum Chandra, 1978 c g
 Odontocolon jezoense (Uchida, 1928) c
 Odontocolon mellipes (Say, 1829) c g
 Odontocolon microclausum Uchida, 1955 c g
 Odontocolon minutum (Telenga, 1930) c g
 Odontocolon nikkoense (Ashmead, 1906) c g
 Odontocolon ochropus Townes, 1960 c g b
 Odontocolon parvum Townes, 1960 c g
 Odontocolon polymorphum Cushman, 1942 c g
 Odontocolon pullum Townes, 1960 c g
 Odontocolon punctatum (Cushman, 1930) c g
 Odontocolon punctulatum (Thomson, 1877) c g
 Odontocolon quercinum (Thomson, 1877) c g
 Odontocolon rufiventris (Holmgren, 1860) c g
 Odontocolon rufum (Uchida, 1928) c
 Odontocolon sierrae Townes, 1960 c g
 Odontocolon spinipes (Gravenhorst, 1829) c g
 Odontocolon stejnegeri (Cushman, 1924) c g
 Odontocolon strangaliae (Rohwer, 1917) c g
 Odontocolon thomsoni (Clement, 1938) c g
 Odontocolon vicinum (Cresson, 1870) c

Data sources: i = ITIS, c = Catalogue of Life, g = GBIF, b = Bugguide.net

References

Further reading

External links

 

Xoridinae